Guantanamo Circus is a half-hour documentary film released in 2013 directed by Christina Linhardt and Michael L. Rose.  It records the arrival and five-day experience of a troupe of circus performers into Guantanamo Bay Naval Base to perform their circus act for the American soldiers stationed at the American military base located there.

The film won a Hollywood F.A.M.E. Award for "Documentary of the Year," and was selected by the Library of Congress for inclusion in its permanent collection. It also won an LA Music Award for its music score by Linhardt.

References

American documentary films